Kristof D'haene (born 6 June 1990 in Kortrijk) is a Belgian professional football player. He plays as winger as well as wing back and is currently on the books of Kortrijk.

Career
He made his Cercle Brugge debut in the UEFA Europa League confrontation against TPS Turku, when he replaced Frederik Boi in the 78th minute. Cercle Brugge eventually won the match 1–2. On 21 November 2010, Kristof D'haene scored the only goal in the Bruges derby. Kristof D'haene played for Club Brugge until mid-2010. He joined, Belgian club, KV Kortrijk in 2015 and he became an integral part of the team, making 41 appearances in 2018–19 season.

References
 Kristof D'haene player info at the official Cercle Brugge site 
 Cerclemuseum.be 
 Club - Cercle 0-1 (21 Nov 2010, match report) 
Belgium Stats at Belgian FA

External links
 Kristof D'haene at Soccerway

Living people
1990 births
Belgian footballers
Belgium under-21 international footballers
Royal Excel Mouscron players
Club Brugge KV players
Cercle Brugge K.S.V. players
K.V. Kortrijk players
Association football defenders
Belgian Pro League players
Sportspeople from Kortrijk
Footballers from West Flanders
K.R.C. Zuid-West-Vlaanderen players